Brandon Wade Hein (born February 17, 1977) was sentenced to life imprisonment without possibility of parole for his involvement in the 1995 stabbing murder of 16-year-old Jimmy Farris, the son of a Los Angeles Police Department officer.
Hein and two other youths who were present when the murder took place, as well as the actual killer, and were convicted under the felony murder rule because the murder was committed during the course of a felony – the attempted robbery of marijuana kept for sale by Farris's friend, Michael McLoren.
Under the felony murder rule, any participant in a felony is criminally responsible for any death that occurs during its commission.  In 2009, Hein's life sentence was commuted to 29 years to life.

A documentary film called Reckless Indifference was made about the murder, trial and resulting prison sentences.  Hein was the only defendant interviewed in the film and has received the bulk of media attention, while equally heavy sentences were handed out to other defendants.  His conviction has courted much controversy, as some feel that the life sentence was overly harsh and politically motivated, while others feel that his involvement justified the sentence.

On May 2, 2017, a book chronicling the Farris case, "One Cut" by Eve Porinchak, was released by Simon & Schuster.

In October 2019, Hein was granted parole. He is expected to be released from prison by summer 2020.

Fistfight and murder
On May 22, 1995, five youths ranging in age from 15 to 18 were drinking alcohol and cruising in a pickup truck around Agoura Hills, a suburban town in Los Angeles County, California.  Less than an hour before the stabbing, one of the five, Jason Holland, 18, grabbed a wallet from an unlocked vehicle in the parking lot of a public park, an act witnessed by the wallet's owner, a mother playing in the park with her children. Shortly thereafter, she recognized the truck and confronted the five, demanding and receiving her wallet back in the face of their threats and intimidation.  This theft and intimidation was used to support the prosecution's contention that the five were still acting in concert at the time of the murder.

Looking for marijuana, the five drove to the home of Michael McLoren, who was known to sell marijuana from a desk drawer in a ramshackle one-room "fort" in his backyard.  A key factor in the murder trial was be whether the five intended to buy marijuana or to steal it.  McLoren, 17, and his friend, Jimmy Farris, 16, were in the yard outside the fort when four of the five youths hopped the fence, with Micah Holland, 15, leading the way.  Micah entered the fort and Anthony Miliotti, 17, physically the largest of the group, stood in the doorway. Their entry to the property drew an additional charge of burglary.

Jason Holland testified he was drunk and lagging behind the others and did not see how the argument between his brother Micah and McLoren started.  As he entered, the two dropped their heads and started fighting.  Brandon Hein, 18, jumped into the fight, as did Jason, who says he was trying to get the bigger McLoren off his brother Micah's back.  Jason opened a folding pocketknife and "pricked" McLoren twice in the back to get him off his brother, then stabbed him in the chest.  When Farris entered the fort to help McLoren, Jason stabbed him twice and Hein punched him in the head and face.  McLoren survived his wounds but Farris died in the emergency room.  When Jason Holland learned from his mother that he was wanted for murder, he went into hiding but several weeks later voluntarily surrendered.

The following description of the fight and stabbing is from the "Summary of Facts and Proceedings" in the January 29, 2001 California Court of Appeal findings.  Note that the term "appellants" excludes Christopher Velardo, 17, owner of the pickup truck, who remained in the truck throughout the incident and was tried separately.At approximately 7:00 p.m. McLoren and Farris were in the McLoren backyard in the immediate vicinity of the fort. Without permission or invitation, all appellants as a group entered the McLoren backyard by hopping over a fence. Micah Holland (Micah) and Miliotti entered first. Jason and Hein followed approximately ten to fifteen feet behind Micah and Miliotti. Micah immediately entered the fort and Miliotti stood in the doorway. Appellants did not have permission or invitation to enter the fort. There had not been prior arrangement for the sale of marijuana between McLoren and appellants.

Appellant Jason was carrying a folding pocketknife. There is no evidence that appellants Micah, Hein, or Miliotti carried weapons or that any of them knew Jason carried a pocketknife.

Appellant Micah unsuccessfully attempted to pull open the locked desk drawer. Next, appellants Micah and Hein, in a threatening manner, shouted words demanding that McLoren turn over the key to the locked desk drawer. Appellant Micah, when threatening McLoren and demanding the key, shouted, “Give me the key fool” and “Give me the key, ese. You want shit with Gumbys, ese?” McLoren refused to relinquish the key.

Appellants Micah, Jason and Hein then verbally and physically assaulted McLoren. The intensity and violence of the battle escalated. McLoren held Micah face down on a bed and elbowed him about the back and neck. Jason attempted to pull McLoren off of Micah. McLoren kicked Jason in the face. McLoren then heard appellant Jason say, “Let’s get this fucker.” While being held in a headlock, McLoren twice felt sharp, debilitating, pulsating sensations, which later proved to be multiple stab wounds. Jason admitted stabbing McLoren.

After McLoren was stabbed, Farris entered the fort and became involved in the melee. Farris confronted Jason, who turned and, without hesitation, stabbed Farris twice in the torso. Immediately thereafter, McLoren observed Hein beating Farris in the head and face with his fists. Farris did not resist or otherwise defend himself from the blows administered by Hein.

Both McLoren and Farris broke away from the fight and ran to McLoren’s house. They each reported to McLoren’s mother that “. . . they (appellants) came to get our stuff . . .” and had stabbed them. Mrs. McLoren saw a stab wound in the center of Farris’ chest.

Witnesses observed appellants together leaving the McLoren yard, being met by
the Velardo pickup truck and driving away in Velardo’s pickup truck. A witness testified that he observed the four appellants on the street as they left the McLoren backyard apparently talking among themselves and smiling.

Charges
Christopher Velardo, 17, who remained outside in the truck throughout the incident, was charged and tried separately.

Micah Holland, 15, Brandon Hein, 18, and Anthony Miliotti, 17, as well as the actual killer Jason Holland, 18, were charged with burglary, attempted robbery, and murder committed during the course of a burglary and an attempted robbery, and with attempted willful, deliberate, premeditated murder of McLoren.

All four were charged with felony murder because the murder was committed during the course of a felony, the alleged attempted robbery of McLoren's marijuana.

California law allows felony murder charges to be "enhanced" by special circumstances if the murder is committed during the commission of certain other crimes, among them robbery and burglary.  The special circumstances of robbery and burglary were both alleged in this case.  Murders under special circumstances require the imposition of the death penalty or life without possibility of parole.

Trial
The severity of the charges polarized the small town of Agoura Hills and attracted international attention.
The case was heard in the Superior Court of Los Angeles County in Malibu, California, with Judge Lawrence Mira presiding.

The issue of the defendants' intent when entering the McLoren property and during the events at the fort was critical and hotly contested throughout the trial.  The defendants said they had gone to the fort to buy, not steal, marijuana that day, so there was no burglary or attempted robbery.  McLoren, testifying as a prosecution witness under promise of immunity from prosecution on drug charges, said there had been no prior arrangement for the sale of marijuana.

Testimony about the earlier wallet theft was introduced, with Judge Mira instructing the jury that it could be considered only to determine if it tended to show the criminal intent required for the offenses charged later that day.
The prosecution said that both incidents were alike, in that they were theft-type offenses involving group action and intimidating conduct by members of the group.

Extensive media coverage before the trial had suggested that the defendants were members of Gumbys, a local street gang. In pre-trial proceedings, Judge Mira found that there was insufficient evidence that the defendants were gang members and excluded any evidence of gang membership.  Notwithstanding this ruling, during cross-examination the prosecution twice asked Jason Holland about Gumbys, including asking him if he was a member.  Judge Mira instructed the jury to ignore these questions.  During closing arguments, the prosecution again strongly suggested the existence of gang activity.  These suggestions of gang activity were brought up in the defendants' later appeal as prejudicial misconduct that deprived them of their right to a fair trial.

Jason Holland admitted stabbing both McLoren and Farris.

On May 28, 1996 the jury found the four defendants guilty of burglary, attempted robbery, and murder committed during the course of a burglary and an attempted robbery, that is, felony murder.  In addition, Jason Holland was convicted of assault with a deadly weapon.  The jury also found the allegations of special circumstances to be true, and found the murder, burglary and attempted robbery to be of the first degree.

Sentences
The four were sentenced to state prison as follows:
Jason Holland - life without possibility of parole plus eight years.
Brandon Hein - life without possibility of parole plus four years.
Tony Miliotti - life without possibility of parole plus four years.
Micah Holland - 29 years to life.

Christopher Velardo pleaded guilty separately to voluntary manslaughter and conspiracy to commit robbery and was sentenced to eleven years. Velardo was released from prison in 2000.

Supporters
The case attracted international attention and support, due largely to media coverage of the charges, the application of the felony murder rule, and the long sentences imposed.

Director William Gazecki made a documentary film called Reckless Indifference about the murder, trial and resulting prison sentences.
In his film, Gazecki argues that the defendants received an unfair trial and overly harsh sentences.

A bill by former California state senator Tom Hayden to revise California's felony murder rule died in the Senate.

Actor Charles Grodin wrote and directed a sympathetic play, The Prosecution of Brandon Hein.

In 2005 Gazecki was a guest speaker at California State University Los Angeles, where his film was shown to Soren Kerk's sociology class with the question in mind, "What is Justice?"

Detractors
Although the crime occurred outside his jurisdiction (in Los Angeles County, not in the city of Los Angeles), Los Angeles police chief Willie Williams wrote to Judge Mira recommending the maximum punishment for all four defendants: life in prison without the possibility of parole.

In an interview with Farris' parents his mother asks, ”How much is too much time for killing someone? For taking away and changing our lives completely, forever?”

Controversy
Supporters of the defendants as well as opponents of the felony murder rule have expressed various concerns and criticisms.

Regarding the charges
According to William Gazecki and other critics, the prosecutor's office was spurred to lay the heaviest possible charges by the victim's father, an LAPD officer; and says that if the victim had not been a police officer's son the felony murder rule would never have been applied.  In a CBS 60 Minutes II segment, a spokesman for the defendants' families charges that the boys were punished not for what they did, but for who was killed.  The spokesman says, "It's about a police officer's son who died.  And the only way they could convict all these kids was use the felony murder rule."  James Farris Sr., the victim's father, says "The fact that I'm a policeman has nothing to do with anything. I just happen to be a policeman whose son was murdered. That's it."
The felony murder rule itself has been criticized as unjust and offensive to the basic notion of fairness, since all participants in the underlying felony are punished equally regardless of their role, or lack of a role, in the murder.  Supporters of the rule regard it as an example of strict liability, whereby a person who chooses to commit a crime is considered absolutely responsible for all the possible consequences of that action.
The application of the felony murder rule in this case was also questioned by those who did not agree that an underlying felony, the attempted robbery of McLoren's marijuana, had actually taken place.

Regarding the trial
Critics have accused the Los Angeles district attorney's office of being less interested in justice than in making up for their embarrassing high-visibility loss in the murder trial of O. J. Simpson a few months earlier.
The fact that the victim's father was an LAPD officer also generated suspicions that the district attorney's office was pressured for convictions, with Farris Sr. supposedly enjoying extraordinary access to authorities and attorneys, and using his influence to gain favors for the prosecution.  Farris says in the film he never was present while prosecutors interviewed witnesses, while Deputy District Attorney Jeff Semow says that Farris "may have been present."
To prove felony murder, the prosecution had to prove that an underlying felony had taken place, the attempted robbery of McLoren's marijuana.  On the witness stand as a prosecution witness, McLoren testified that there had been no prior arrangement for the sale of marijuana.  Before he testified, the prosecution had given him immunity from prosecution for selling drugs, a fact not known to the jury.
Extensive pre-trial media coverage available to the pool of potential jurors suggested that the defendants were gang members.  Judge Mira found that there was insufficient evidence of gang membership, and ruled that no evidence of this type was allowed in the trial. Notwithstanding this ruling, the prosecution several times asked questions about gang membership or otherwise suggested to the jury the existence of gang activity.  After each suggestion, the judge instructed the jury to ignore it, a process likened by some critics to "trying to unring a bell".  Interviewed in Reckless Indifference, Harvard law professor Alan Dershowitz says the prosecutors "terrorized" the jury into believing the defendants were violent gang members.

Regarding the sentences
The sentences – 29 years to life for Micah Holland, life without possibility of parole for Hein,  Miliotti, and Jason Holland – have been widely criticised as out of proportion to the nature of the crimes.  Dershowitz calls the sentence "disproportional, outrageous, unconstitutional and immoral."

Appeals

State appeals

An appeal of the convictions and sentences to the California Court of Appeal for the Second District charged prosecutors with misconduct and presenting inadmissible evidence, including alleging that the defendants belonged to the Gumbys street gang.  Among other things, the appeal also alleged that it was improper to present the earlier wallet theft to the jury; that the prosecution engaged in egregious personal attacks on defense counsel; and that the verdicts were inconsistent.  It further alleged juror misconduct, judicial bias, and faulty instructions to the jury.

Defending the sentences, Deputy District Attorney Victoria Bedrossian argued that while only Jason Holland wielded the knife, the defendants acted "in concert."
"Each appellant was a major participant who acted with reckless indifference to Jimmy Farris' life," Bedrossian said. "The sentences in this case do not offend fundamental notions of human dignity and the penalties in this case should not be changed."

On 29 January 2001 the California Court of Appeal ruled that "In order to warrant reversal, it must be determined that the alleged misconduct has prejudiced appellants’ right to a fair trial. In this case, the evidence against appellants was overwhelming." The Court affirmed the convictions and sentencing of Jason Holland, Brandon Hein and Micah Holland.  The special circumstance finding against Anthony Miliotti, who stood and watched, was struck from the record and his crime reduced to second-degree murder, and his case sent back to the trial court for resentencing, resulting in a new sentence of nineteen years to life.

The California Supreme Court denied petitions for review on April 25, 2001.

Hein filed a petition for a writ of certiorari with the United States Supreme Court, which was denied on October 1, 2001.

A petition for a writ of habeas corpus with the California Supreme Court was filed on September 23, 2002, which was summarily denied on May 12, 2004.

Federal appeals
Following exhaustion of their appeals in state court, Hein, Miliotti, Micah and Jason Holland filed individual Petition for Writ of Habeas Corpus in the United States District Court for the Central District of California in May and July 2004. The petitions raised identical, overlapping, and separate claims: Brady violations, prosecutorial misconduct, ineffective assistance of counsel, improper exclusion or admission of evidence, juror misconduct, judicial misconduct, cruel and unusual punishment, and arbitrary and capricious sentence reduction. On April 3, 2007, the United States magistrate judge assigned to the case filed a joint Report and Recommendation, recommending that the petitions be denied. All four appellants filed objections to the Magistrate's report, but the United States District Judge adopted the Report and Recommendation without modification. Each appellant then requested a Certificate of Appealability to the United States Court of Appeals for the Ninth Circuit, which were all granted in whole or in part by the District Court. On January 17, 2008, the Ninth Circuit Court granted a motion to consolidate the appeals of the four appellants.

On October 7, 2009 the appeals were heard by a three-judge panel of the United States Court of Appeals for the Ninth Circuit.  Attorneys for the four alleged false testimony by McLoren and misconduct by the prosecution, including failure to disclose evidence favorable to the defense.

On April 12, 2010 the appeals were denied, with the court acknowledging some instances of prosecutorial misconduct but saying their combined effect, along with the nondisclosure of McLoren's immunity, was not sufficient to render the trial fundamentally unfair.

On May 26, 2010 attorneys for Hein, Miliotti, and Jason Holland filed a "Joint Petition for Rehearing En Banc." Attorneys for Micah Holland filed a separate "Petition for Rehearing En Banc." In the petitions, the attorneys argue that the April 12 opinion by the three-judge panel "conflicts with a well-settled body of law within the Ninth Circuit," and that "En banc review is necessary to secure and maintain the uniformity of this Court’s decisions."

On July 16, 2010, the three-judge panel of the Ninth Circuit Court issued an order stating that "The full court has been advised of the petitions for rehearing en banc and no judge has requested a vote on whether to rehear the matter en banc. The petitions for panel rehearing and the petitions for rehearing en banc are denied."

On November 15, 2010, attorneys for the four petitioners filed a petition for a writ of certiorari with the Supreme Court of the United States. The petition was denied on April 18, 2011.

Commutation to 29 years to life with the possibility of parole
On March 17, 2009, Hein's sentence was commuted by Governor Schwarzenegger, from life without possibility of parole plus four years, to 29 years to life with the possibility of parole. Hein's "Initial Suitability Hearing" is scheduled for October 30, 2019.

Current status
Brandon Hein, Micah Holland, and Jason Holland remain in prison. Their legal appeals have been exhausted. Miliotti appeared before the Board of Parole Hearings on April 28, 2011. The board found that Miliotti was "not yet suitable for parole and would pose an unreasonable risk of danger or a threat to public safety if released from prison," and gave him a ten-year denial. However, under Marsy's Law, a life inmate who is denied parole may, in three year intervals, request that his or her hearing be moved to an earlier date.
Miliotti filed a petition to advance which was approved and his next hearing was advanced from ten to seven years. His "Subsequent Parole Consideration Hearing" took place on March 8, 2018. The parole board found that, "Mr. Miliotti does not pose an unreasonable risk of danger to society or threat to public safety and is therefore suitable for parole."
On December 24, 2018, Governor Edmund G. Brown, Jr. commuted Jason Holland's sentence, from life without the possibility of parole plus eight years, to 30 years to life.
Micah Holland appeared before the Board of Parole Hearings on March 13, 2019. He was denied parole and given a seven year denial.

Bill under consideration would require re-sentencing
As of August 16, 2018, a bill which would reduce the broad scope allowed in charging "special circumstances" has been approved by the California Senate and awaits action by the Assembly. The bill would restrict the charging of  special circumstances to only those who actually commit murder or who are directly involved, and would require re-sentencing of offenders such as Hein.

See also
Felony murder and the death penalty

References

External links
Hein's web site - "Life in Prison: The Felony Murder Rule in California"
Brandon Hein blog maintained by his parents
YouTube - CBS 60 Minutes news article on Brandon Hein
Brandon Hein Case - Newspaper Articles

Living people
American people convicted of murder
People convicted of murder by California
American murderers of children
American prisoners sentenced to life imprisonment
Prisoners sentenced to life imprisonment by California
1977 births
Place of birth missing (living people)